Greek Extended is a Unicode block containing the accented vowels necessary for writing polytonic Greek. The regular, unaccented Greek characters as well as the characters with tonos and diaeresis can be found in the Greek and Coptic block. Greek Extended was encoded in version 1.1 of the Unicode Standard. As an alternative to Greek Extended, combining characters can be used to represent the tones and breath marks of polytonic Greek.

In this block, the letters with oxia (acute accent) and no other accent are not used in any of the Unicode normalizations.

History
The following Unicode-related documents record the purpose and process of defining specific characters in the Greek Extended block:

References 

	 
Unicode blocks